Napoléon Turcot (30 June 1867 – 27 December 1939) was a Canadian politician.

Born in  Montreal, Quebec, Turcot was a member of the Legislative Assembly of Quebec for Montréal-Laurier from 1912 to 1919.

References

1867 births
1939 deaths
Politicians from Montreal
Quebec Liberal Party MNAs